Doris beringiensis is a species of sea slug, a dorid nudibranch, a marine gastropod mollusc in the family Dorididae.

Distribution
This species was described from the Commander Islands, Kamchatka.

References

Dorididae
Gastropods described in 2015